Dicerca crassicollis is a species of metallic wood-boring beetle in the family Buprestidae. It is found in North America.

Subspecies
These two subspecies belong to the species Dicerca crassicollis:
 Dicerca crassicollis crassicollis
 Dicerca crassicollis hesperica Casey

References

Further reading

 
 
 

Buprestidae
Beetles of North America
Beetles described in 1857
Taxa named by John Lawrence LeConte
Articles created by Qbugbot